The men's 400 metres at the 2014 IPC Athletics European Championships was held at the Swansea University Stadium from 18–23 August.

Medalists

Results

T11
Final

T12
Final

T13
Final

T20
Semifinals

Final

T34
Semifinals

Final

T36
Final

T37
Final

T44
Final

T47
Final

T51
Final

T52
Final

T53
Final

T54
Final

See also
List of IPC world records in athletics

References

400 metres
400 metres at the World Para Athletics European Championships